Millersport is an unincorporated community in Madison Township, Dubois County, in the U.S. state of Indiana.

History
Millersport was founded in 1833. The community was named for its founder, Stephen McDonald Miller.

Geography

References

Unincorporated communities in Dubois County, Indiana
Unincorporated communities in Indiana